Zheng Yuanlin (born April 1962) is a lieutenant general (zhongjiang) of the People's Liberation Army (PLA). He has been Deputy Commander of the PLA Air Force (PLAAF) since December 2018. He was promoted to the rank of major general (shaojiang) in July 2010 and lieutenant general (zhongjiang) in December 2019.

Biography
Zheng was born in Pingdu, Shandong in April 1962.

He enlisted in the People's Liberation Army (PLA) in 1978. In January 2010 he was promoted to become Deputy Chief of Staff of the Guangzhou Military Region Air Force. In October 2012 he was promoted again to become Chief of Staff of the Chengdu Military Region Air Force, he remained in that position until March 2013, when he was transferred to Guangzhou and appointed Chief of Staff of the Guangzhou Military Region Air Force. In January 2016, he was appointed Chief of Staff of the newly founded Southern Theater Command Air Force. He rose to become Deputy Commander of the PLA Air Force (PLAAF) in December 2018.

References

1962 births
Living people
People from Pingdu
People's Liberation Army generals from Shandong